Drew Locke (born 11 September 1986) is a rugby union player for London Scottish. His position of choice is at centre but is also able to play at fullback. His previous clubs were Jersey, Cornish Pirates, Coventry and the Exeter Chiefs.

Drew Locke joined Aviva Premiership side Gloucester Rugby from Cornish Pirates on a one-year contract from September 2012. Following his release from Gloucester, Locke returned to the RFU Championship to sign for Jersey.

Drew Locke is the brother of Gareth Locke a Made in Chelsea regular cast member and businessman. Gareth is married to other series regular and actor Ollie Locke as of November 2020.

References

External links
 Exeter profile
 Cornish Pirates profile

1986 births
Living people
English rugby union players
Coventry R.F.C. players
Exeter Chiefs players
Cornish Pirates players
People from Braintree, Essex
Rugby union players from Essex
Rugby union centres